Motahar Hossain is a Bangladesh Awami League politician and the former State Minister of Primary and Mass Education.

Career 
Motahar is the present chairperson of the parliamentary standing committee on primary and mass education ministry. He is the president of Bangladesh Awami League Lalmonirhat District unit. He served as the State Minister of Primary and Mass Education from 2009. After being appointed state minister he said Bangladesh will remove illiteracy by 2012. In 2013, he was confined in the Lalmonirhat District auditorium by members of Bangladesh Awami League over the formation of Lalmonirhat Sadar Upazila committee of Bangladesh Awami League. In 2014, he defeated Hussain Muhammad Ershad to win the Lalmonirhat 1 constituency in the 10th Bangladesh General Election.

Controversy 
Motahar, chairperson of the parliamentary standing committee on primary and mass education ministry, on 20 December 2017 claimed that Government of Bangladesh could not be held responsible for the leak of school exam papers. He filed a defamation suit against the editor and publisher of Bangladesh Pratidin, Naem Nizam and Moynal Hossain Chowdhury respectively, over a news item in the paper on 9 April 2014 titled Sabekder Amalnama: Ration Dealer Sabek Protimontri Motaharer Shato Koti Taka. Lalmonirhat Cognizance Court-4, Judge Md Afaz Uddin, issued an arrested warrant against the accused on 11 January 2018. The duo secured an anticipatory bail from Bangladesh High Court on 15 January 2018.

References

Awami League politicians
Living people
8th Jatiya Sangsad members
9th Jatiya Sangsad members
10th Jatiya Sangsad members
State Ministers of Primary and Mass Education (Bangladesh)
11th Jatiya Sangsad members
1948 births
People from Lalmonirhat District